Acacia saliciformis is a shrub or tree belonging to the genus Acacia and the subgenus Phyllodineae native to eastern Australia.

Description
It has acutely angled, dark red, glabrous branchlets. Like most species of Acacia it has phyllodes rather than true leaves. The thin grey-green phyllodes have a narrowly elliptic to lanceolate shape and are straight to shallowly falcate. When it blooms it produces a racemose inflorescences with spherical flower-heads containing 20 to 32 pale yellow to creamy white flowers. After flowering firmly chartaceous stipitate seed pods are formed that have a broadly linear to narrowly oblong shape and are raised slightly along the midline.

Taxonomy
The species was first formally described by the botanist Mary Tindale in 1966 as part of R.H.Anderson's work New taxa of Acacia from Eastern Australia as published in Contributions from the New South Wales National Herbarium. It was reclassified as Racosperma saliciforme by Leslie Pedley in 2003 then transferred back to genus Acacia in 2006.

Distribution
It is endemic to parts of New South Wales between Bilpin in the south and Mount Kindarun in the north on sandstone ridges growing in thin sandy soils as a part of dry sclerophyll forest communities.

See also
 List of Acacia species

References

saliciformis
Flora of New South Wales
Plants described in 1966